The Andrijevci railway station is a railway station on the Novska–Tovarnik railway. It is located in settlement Donji Andrijevci. The railroad continues to Garčin in one direction and to Strizivojna–Vrpolje in the other. The Andrijevci railway station consists of six railway tracks.

See also 
 Croatian Railways
 Zagreb–Belgrade railway

References 

Railway stations in Croatia